Charles Cunningham Connor (c. 1840 – 10 February 1914) was an  MP for North Antrim.

Connor was educated at the Royal Academical Institution, Belfast and Queen's University Belfast, and was a businessman prior to entering Parliament, as well as an alderman of Belfast City Council. Between 1889 and 1891 he was Mayor of Belfast (the last before the post was upgraded to Lord Mayor). He was elected to Parliament at the general election of 1892, but did not stand in 1895.

References

Members of Parliament after 1832 - Charles Connor

Irish Unionist Party MPs
1840s births
1914 deaths
Mayors of Belfast
Members of the Parliament of the United Kingdom for County Antrim constituencies (1801–1922)
UK MPs 1892–1895